Ken McKaige (17 August 1929 – 26 September 2009) was an Australian rules footballer who played with Melbourne and Carlton in the Victorian Football League (VFL).

He was delisted by the Blues and crossed to Camberwell in the VFA for the 1955 season, where he played only another handful of matches before hanging up his boots for good.

Two of McKaige's sons also played for Melbourne Football Club as juniors. His other sons were both signed to the club at young ages to ensure they were not residentially tied to another club. Cameron was only 5 years old at the time. Andrew McKaige went on to be an Australian television actor.

Notes

External links 

Ken McKaige's profile at Blueseum

1929 births
Carlton Football Club players
Melbourne Football Club players
Australian rules footballers from Victoria (Australia)
Old Melburnians Football Club players
Camberwell Football Club players
2009 deaths